The men's sprint competition of the cycling events at the 2019 Pan American Games was held on August 2 and August 3 at the Velodrome. 

Njisane Phillip of Trinidad and Tobago originally won the silver medal, but was disqualified for doping.

Records
Prior to this competition, the existing world and Games records were as follows:

Schedule

Results

Qualification
Fastest 12 riders continue to the eighth-finals.

Eighth-finals
The winners of each advance to the quarterfinals, while the losers advance to the repechage

Repechage 
The winner of each advanced to the quarterfinals.

Quarterfinals
The winner of each advanced to the semifinals.

Race for 5th–8th Places

Semifinals
The winner of each advanced to the final.

Finals
The final classification is determined in the medal finals.

References

Track cycling at the 2019 Pan American Games
Men's sprint (track cycling)